The Twenty-fifth Amendment (Amendment XXV) to the United States Constitution deals with presidential succession and disability.

It clarifies that the vice president becomes president if the president dies, resigns, or is removed from office, and establishes how a vacancy in the office of the vice president can be filled.
It also provides for the temporary transfer of the president's powers and duties to the vice president, either on the initiative of the president alone or on the initiative of the vice president together with a majority of the president's cabinet. In either case, the vice president becomes acting president until the presidential powers and duties are returned to the president.

The amendment was submitted to the states on July 6, 1965, by the 89th Congress and was adopted on February 10, 1967, the day that the requisite number of states (38) had ratified it.

Text and effect

Section 1: Presidential succession 

Section 1 clarifies that in the enumerated situations the vice president becomes president, instead of merely assuming the powers and duties of the presidency as acting president. It operates automatically, without needing to be explicitly invoked.

Section 2: Vice presidential vacancy 

Section 2 provides a mechanism for filling a vacancy in the vice presidency. Before the Twenty-fifth Amendment, a vice presidential vacancy continued until a new vice president took office at the start of the next presidential term; the vice presidency had become vacant several times due to death, resignation, or succession to the presidency, and these vacancies had often lasted several years.

Section 3: President's declaration of inability 

Section 3 allows for the voluntary transfer of presidential authority to the vice president (for example, in anticipation of a medical procedure) by the president declaring in writing to be unable to discharge the powers and duties of the presidency. The vice president then assumes those powers and duties as acting president; the vice president does not become president and the president remains in office, although without authority. The president regains those powers and duties upon declaring, in writing, to be again able to discharge them.

Section 4: Declaration by vice president and cabinet members of president's inability 

Section 4 addresses the case of a president who is unable to discharge the powers and duties of the presidency but cannot, or does not, execute the voluntary declaration contemplated by Section3. It allows the vice president, together with a "majority of either the principal officers of the executive departments or of such other body as Congress may by law provide", to issue a written declaration that the president is unable to discharge his duties. Immediately upon such a declaration being sent to Congress, the vice president becomes acting president
while (as with Section3) the president remains in office, albeit temporarily divested of authority.

John Feerick, the principal draftsman of the amendment, writes that Congress deliberately left the terms unable and inability undefined "since cases of inability could take various forms not neatly fitting into  [a rigid] definition... The debates surrounding the Twenty-fifth Amendment indicate that [those terms] are intended to cover all cases in which some condition or circumstance prevents the President from discharging his powers and duties..."
A survey of scholarship on the amendment found

Among potential examples of such unforeseen emergencies, legal scholars have listed kidnapping of the president and "political emergencies" such as impeachment.
Traits such as unpopularity, incompetence, impeachable conduct, poor judgment, or laziness might not in and of themselves constitute inability, but should such traits "rise to a level where they prevented the President from carrying out his or her constitutional duties, they still might constitute an inability, even in the absence of a formal medical diagnosis." In addition, a president who already manifested disabling traits at the time he or she was elected is not thereby immunized from a declaration of inability.

The "principal officers of the executive departments" are the fifteen Cabinet members enumerated in the United States Code at :

 Secretary of State
 Secretary of the Treasury
 Secretary of Defense
 Attorney General
 Secretary of the Interior
 Secretary of Agriculture
 Secretary of Commerce
 Secretary of Labor
 Secretary of Health and Human Services
 Secretary of Housing and Urban Development
 Secretary of Transportation
 Secretary of Energy
 Secretary of Education
 Secretary of Veterans Affairs
 Secretary of Homeland Security

Acting secretaries can participate in issuing the declaration.

If the president subsequently issues a declaration claiming to be able, then a four-day period begins during which the vice president remains acting president.
If by the end of this period the vice president and a majority of the "principal officers" have not issued a second declaration of the president's inability, then the president resumes his powers and duties; but if they do issue a second declaration within the four days, then the vice president remains acting president while Congress considers the matter. Then if within 21 days the Senate and the House determine, each by a two-thirds vote, that the president is unable, then the vice president continues as acting president; otherwise the president resumes his powers and duties.

Section 4's requirement of a two-thirds vote of the House and a two-thirds vote of the Senate is more strict than the Constitution's requirement for impeachment and removal of the president for "high crimes and misdemeanors"a majority of the House followed by two-thirds of the Senate.
In addition, an impeached president retains his authority unless and until the Senate votes to remove him or her at the end of an impeachment trial; in contrast, should Congress be called upon to decide the question of the president's ability or inability under Section4, presidential authority remains in the hands of the vice president (as acting president) unless and until the question is resolved in the president's favor.

Historical background 
ArticleII, Section1, Clause6 of the Constitution reads:

This provision is ambiguous as to whether, in the enumerated circumstances, the vice president becomes the president, or merely assumes the "powers and duties" of the presidency. It also fails to define what constitutes inability, or how questions concerning inability are to be resolved. The Twenty-fifth Amendment addressed these deficiencies. The ambiguities in ArticleII, Section1, Clause6 of the Constitution regarding death, resignation, removal, or disability of the president created difficulties several times:

 In 1841, William Henry Harrison died in office. It had previously been suggested that the vice president would become acting president upon the death of the president, but Vice President John Tyler asserted that he had succeeded to the presidency, instead of merely assuming its powers and duties; he also declined to acknowledge documents referring to him as acting president. Although Tyler felt his vice presidential oath obviated any need for the presidential oath, he was persuaded that being formally sworn in would resolve any doubts. Accordingly, he took the oath and title of "President," without any qualifiers, moved into the White House and assumed full presidential powers. Though Tyler was sometimes derided as "His Accidency", both houses of Congress adopted a resolution confirming that he was president. The "Tyler precedent" of succession was thus established, and subsequently Millard Fillmore (1850), Andrew Johnson (1865), Chester A. Arthur (1881), Theodore Roosevelt (1901), Calvin Coolidge (1923), Harry Truman (1945), and Lyndon Johnson (1963) were all deemed to have become president on the death of incumbent presidents.
 In 1893, Grover Cleveland secretly had cancer surgery, after which he was incapacitated for a time and kept from public view.
 Following Woodrow Wilson's stroke in 1919, no one officially assumed his powers and duties, in part because his condition was kept secret by his wife, Edith Wilson, and the White House physician, Cary T. Grayson. By the time Wilson's condition became public knowledge, only a few months remained in his term and Congressional leaders were disinclined to press the issue.
 Prior to 1967, the office of vice president had become vacant sixteen times when the vice president died, resigned, or succeeded to the presidency. The vacancy created when Andrew Johnson succeeded to the presidency upon Abraham Lincoln's assassination was one of several that encompassed nearly the entire four-year term. In 1868, Johnson was impeached by the House of Representatives and came one vote short of being removed from office by the Senate in his impeachment trial. Had Johnson been removed, President pro tempore Benjamin Wade would have become acting president in accordance with the Presidential Succession Act of 1792.
 After several periods of incapacity due to severe health problems, President Dwight D. Eisenhower attempted to clarify procedures through a signed agreement with Vice President Richard Nixon, drafted by Attorney General Herbert Brownell Jr. However, this agreement did not have legal authority. Eisenhower suffered a heart attack in September 1955 and intestinal problems requiring emergency surgery in July 1956. Each time, until Eisenhower was able to resume his duties, Nixon presided over Cabinet meetings and, along with Eisenhower aides, kept the executive branch functioning and assured the public the situation was under control. However, Nixon refused to use the president's office in the White House or sit in the president's chair at Cabinet meetings.
The 1951 novel The Caine Mutiny and its 1954 film version influenced the drafters of the amendment. John D. Feerick told The Washington Post in 2018 that the film was a "live depiction" of the type of crisis that could arise "if a president ever faced questions about physical or mental inabilities but disagreed completely with the judgment", which was not dealt with in the Constitution. Lawmakers and lawyers drafting the amendment wanted no such "Article 184 situation" as depicted in the film, in which the Vice President of the U.S. or others could topple the President by merely saying that the President was "disabled".

Proposal, enactment, and ratification

Keating–Kefauver proposal 

In 1963, Senator Kenneth Keating of New York proposed a Constitutional amendment which would have enabled Congress to enact legislation providing for how to determine when a president is unable to discharge the powers and duties of the presidency, rather than, as the Twenty-fifth Amendment does, having the Constitution so provide. This proposal was based upon a recommendation of the American Bar Association in 1960.

The text of the proposal read:

Senators raised concerns that the Congress could either abuse such authority, or neglect to enact any such legislation after the adoption of this proposal. Tennessee senator Estes Kefauver, the Chairman of the Senate Judiciary Committee's Subcommittee on Constitutional Amendments, a long-time advocate for addressing the disability question, spearheaded the effort until he died in August 1963. Senator Keating was defeated in the 1964 election, but Senator Roman Hruska of Nebraska took up Keating's cause as a new member of the Subcommittee on Constitutional Amendments.

Kennedy assassination 

By the 1960s, medical advances had made increasingly plausible that an injured or ill president might live a long time while incapacitated. The assassination of John F. Kennedy in 1963 underscored the need for a clear procedure for determining presidential disability, particularly since the new president, Lyndon Johnson, had once suffered a heart attack andwith the office of vice president to remain vacant until the next term began on January 20, 1965the next two people in the line of succession were the 86-year-old Senate president pro tempore Carl Hayden and the 71-year-old speaker of the House John McCormack. Senator Birch Bayh succeeded Kefauver as Chairman of the Subcommittee on Constitutional Amendments and set about advocating for a detailed amendment dealing with presidential disability.

Bayh–Celler proposal 

On January 6, 1965, Senator Birch Bayh proposed S.J. Res.1 in the Senate and Representative Emanuel Celler (Chairman of the House Judiciary Committee) proposed H.J. Res.1 in the House of Representatives. Their proposal specified the process by which a president could be declared "unable to discharge the powers and duties of his office", thereby making the vice president an acting president, and how the president could regain the powers of their office. Also, their proposal provided a way to fill a vacancy in the office of vice president before the next presidential election. This was as opposed to the Keating–Kefauver proposal, which neither provided for filling a vacancy in the office of vice president prior to the next presidential election, nor provided a process for determining presidential disability. In 1964, the American Bar Association endorsed the type of proposal which Bayh and Celler advocated. On January 28, 1965, President Johnson endorsed S.J. Res.1 in a statement to Congress. Their proposal received bipartisan support.

On February 19, the Senate passed the amendment, but the House passed a different version of the amendment on April13. On April22 it was returned to the Senate with revisions. There were four areas of disagreement between the House and Senate versions:
 the Senate official who was to receive any written declaration under the amendment
 the period of time during which the vice president and principal officers of the executive departments must decide whether they disagree with the president's declaration that they are fit to resume the duties of the presidency
 the time before Congress meets to resolve the issue
 the time limit for Congress to reach a decision.
On July 6, after a conference committee ironed out differences between the versions, the final version of the amendment was passed by both Houses of the Congress and presented to the states for ratification.

Ratification 

Nebraska was the first state to ratify, on July12, 1965, and ratification became complete when Nevada became the 38th state to ratify, on February10, 1967.

When President Lyndon B. Johnson underwent planned surgery in 1965, he was unable to temporarily transfer power to Vice President Hubert H. Humphrey because ratification remained incomplete. On February23, 1967, at the White House ceremony certifying the ratification, Johnson said:

Invocations and considered invocations

Sections 1 and 2: Richard Nixon, Gerald Ford, Nelson Rockefeller 

On October 10, 1973, Vice President Spiro Agnew resigned; two days later President Richard Nixon nominated Representative Gerald Ford to replace Agnew as new vice president pursuant to Section2. Ford was confirmed by the Senate and the House on November27 and December6 respectively, and sworn in December6.

On August 9, 1974 Nixon resigned and Ford became president under Section1; Ford is the only president to have been elected neither president nor vice president.
The office of vice president was thus again vacant, and on August20 President Ford nominated former New York governor Nelson Rockefeller. Rockefeller was confirmed by the Senate and the House on December 10 and 19 respectively, and sworn in December 19.

Feerick writes that the Twenty-fifth Amendment helped pave the way for Nixon's resignation during the Watergate scandal. Nixon and Agnew were Republicans, and in the months immediately following Agnew's resignation, with the vice presidency empty, removal or resignation of Nixon would have transferred the presidential powers to House Speaker Carl Albert, a Democrat. But once Ford (a Republican) became vice president under Section 2, removal of Nixon became more palatable because it would, now, not result in a change in the party holding the presidency, and therefore "the momentum for exposing the truth about Nixon's involvement in Watergate increased."

Section 3 

On December 22, 1978, President Jimmy Carter considered invoking Section3 in advance of hemorrhoid surgery. Since then, presidents Ronald Reagan, George H. W. Bush, Bill Clinton, and Barack Obama also considered invoking Section3 at various times without doing so.

1985: George H. W. Bush 

On July 12, 1985, President Ronald Reagan underwent a colonoscopy and was diagnosed with bowel cancer. He elected to have the lesion removed immediately, and consulted with White House counsel Fred Fielding about whether to invoke Section3, and in particular about whether doing so would set an undesirable precedent. Fielding and White House Chief of Staff Donald Regan recommended that Reagan transfer power, and two letters were drafted: one specifically invoking Section3, the other mentioning only that Reagan was mindful of its provisions. On July 13, Reagan signed the second letter before being placed under general anesthesia for a colectomy, and Vice President George H. W. Bush was acting president from 11:28 a.m. until 7:22 p.m., when Reagan transmitted a letter declaring himself able to resume his duties.

In the Fordham Law Review, commentator John Feerick asserted that although Reagan disclaimed any use of the Twenty-fifth Amendment in his letter (likely out of "fear of the reaction of the country and the world to a 'President' who admitted to being disabled, and concern ... [over] set[ting] a harmful precedent"), he followed the process set forth in Section3. Furthermore, Feerick noted that "no constitutional provision except the Twenty-Fifth Amendment would have allowed" him to designate the vice president as acting president. Reagan later stated in a memoir that he had, in fact, invoked the Twenty-fifth Amendment.

2002: Dick Cheney 
On June 29, 2002, President George W. Bush explicitly invoked Section3 in temporarily transferring his powers to Vice President Dick Cheney before undergoing a colonoscopy, which began at 7:09 a.m. Bush awoke about forty minutes later, but did not resume his presidential powers until 9:24 a.m. to ensure any aftereffects had cleared. According to his staff, Acting President Cheney held his regular national security and homeland security meetings with aides at the White House, but made no appearances and took no recorded actions while being acting president.

In the view of commentator Adam Gustafson, this confident application of Section3 "rectified" President Reagan's "ambivalent invocation" and provided an example of a "smooth and temporary transition" under Section3 that paved the way for future applications. Together with the 2007 invocation, it established the reasonableness of invocation for relatively minor inabilities, promoting continuity in the Executive Branch.

2007: Dick Cheney 
On July 21, 2007, Bush again invoked Section3 before another colonoscopy. Cheney was acting president from 7:16 a.m. until 9:21 a.m. During that time, Vice President Cheney (as acting president) remained at home. This 2007 invocation and the 2002 invocation received relatively little attention in the press overall.

2021: Kamala Harris 
On November 19, 2021, President Joe Biden temporarily transferred his powers and duties to Vice President Kamala Harris before undergoing a colonoscopy, making her acting president from 10:10 a.m. until 11:35 a.m. Harris is the first woman to hold the powers and duties of the U.S. presidency.

Section 4 

Section 4 has never been invoked, though on several occasions its use was considered.

1981: Reagan assassination attempt 

Following the attempted assassination of Ronald Reagan on March30, 1981, Vice President George H. W. Bush did not assume the presidential powers and duties as acting president. Reagan had been rushed into surgery with no opportunity to invoke Section3; Bush did not invoke Section4 because he was on a plane at the time of the shooting, and Reagan was out of surgery by the time Bush landed in Washington. In 1995, Birch Bayh, the primary sponsor of the amendment in the Senate, wrote that Section4 should have been invoked. Physician to the President Daniel Ruge, who supervised Reagan's treatment immediately after the shooting, said he had erred by not having Reagan invoke Section3 because the president needed general anesthesia and was in an intensive care unit.

1987: Reagan's possible incapacity 

From the end of the 1980s onwards, Reagan's political opponents alleged that he showed signs of dementia. According to Reagan biographer Edmund Morris, staffers to White House chief of staff Howard Baker intended to use their first meeting with Reagan in 1987 to evaluate whether he was "losing his mental grip". However, Reagan "came in stimulated by the press of all these new people and performed splendidly".

Reagan was diagnosed with Alzheimer's disease in 1994, five years after leaving office. The president told neurosurgeon Daniel Ruge, according to Ruge in 1980, that he expected doctors to test his memory, and promised to resign if it deteriorated. After the 1994 diagnosis, Ruge said he never found any sign of Alzheimer's while talking to him almost every day from 1981 to 1985.

2017: Trump fires James Comey 

After President Donald Trump dismissed FBI director James Comey in May 2017, acting FBI director Andrew McCabe claimed that Deputy Attorney General Rod Rosenstein held high-level discussions within the Justice Department about approaching Vice President Mike Pence and the Cabinet about possibly invoking Section4. Miles Taylor, who anonymously authored "I Am Part of the Resistance Inside the Trump Administration" and A Warning, also wrote that he and other aides considered approaching Pence to invoke the Twenty-fifth Amendment. A spokesperson later said that Rosenstein denied pursuing the Twenty-fifth Amendment, and Pence strongly denied considering invoking Section4. On March 15, 2019, Senator Lindsey Graham stated the Senate Judiciary Committee would investigate the discussions and seek related documents.

2021: Trump and the Capitol attack 

After the January 6 United States Capitol attack, President Trump was accused of having incited the incident, leading to several calls for Section4 to be invoked. Proponents included Representatives Ted Lieu and Charlie Crist, former Defense Secretary William Cohen, and the National Association of Manufacturers (which asked Vice President Pence to "seriously consider" invoking the amendment). By evening, some of Trump's Cabinet members were also reportedly considering invoking Section4. In a New York magazine article, law professor Paul Campos also supported using Section4 "immediately" and "for the good of the nation." On January 7, incoming Senate majority leader Chuck Schumer and Speaker of the House of Representatives Nancy Pelosi also called for Section4 to be invoked.

See also 

 Presidential Succession Act
 United States presidential line of succession

Notes

References

Sources 

 Constitution of the United States of America
 
 
 
 
 CNN Story of White House statement regarding G.W. Bush temporary transfer of power to VP Cheney July 21, 2007.
 Presidential Inability and Subjective Meaning by Adam R.F. Gustafson, Yale Law & Policy Review, Vol. 27 (2009), p. 459.
 Presidential Succession and Inability: Before and After the Twenty-Fifth Amendment  by John Feerick, Fordham Law Review, Vol. 79 (2011), p. 908.
 The Twenty-Fifth Amendment: Its Complete History and Applications, Third Edition  by John Feerick (Fordham University Press, 2013).
 25th Constitutional Amendment  The Great Society Congress, Association of Centers for the Study of Congress (URL accessed April 6, 2016).
 Twenty-Fifth Amendment Archive Fordham Law Archive of Scholarship and History (URL accessed February 22, 2017).

External links 

 CRS Annotated Constitution: Twenty-fifth Amendment
 The Great Society Congress
 Twenty-Fifth Amendment Archive
 Presidential Disability Under the Twenty-Fifth Amendment: Constitutional Provisions and Perspectives for CongressCongressional Research Service

 
1967 in American law
Amendments to the United States Constitution
United States presidential succession
Vice presidency of the United States
1967 in American politics